In theoretical physics, one often analyzes theories with supersymmetry in which D-terms play an important role. In four dimensions, the minimal N=1 supersymmetry may be written using a superspace. This superspace involves four extra fermionic coordinates , transforming as a two-component spinor and its conjugate.

Every superfield, i.e. a field that depends on all coordinates of the superspace, may be expanded with respect to the new fermionic coordinates. The generic kind of superfields, typically a vector superfield, indeed depend on all these coordinates. The last term in the corresponding expansion, namely , is called the D-term.

Manifestly supersymmetric Lagrangians may also be written as integrals over the whole superspace. Some special terms, such as the superpotential, may be written as integrals over s only, which are known as F-terms, and should be contrasted with the present D-terms.

See also
 F-term
 Supersymmetric gauge theory

Supersymmetric quantum field theory